Pascal Zerressen (born November 22, 1992) is a German professional ice hockey defenceman. He is currently playing for Krefeld Pinguine in the DEL2.

Zerressen originally played with Krefeld in the Deutsche Eishockey Liga (DEL) before joining fellow German club, Kölner Haie.

He played nine seasons in Cologne, before returning on a one-year contract to Krefeld Pinguine upon their relegation to the DEL2 on 18 May 2022.

Career statistics

International

References

External links

1992 births
Living people
German ice hockey defencemen
Kölner Haie players
Krefeld Pinguine players
People from Viersen (district)
Sportspeople from Düsseldorf (region)